Ermin Bičakčić (born 24 January 1990) is a Bosnian professional footballer who plays as a centre-back for Bundesliga club 1899 Hoffenheim and the Bosnia and Herzegovina national team.

Bičakčić started his professional career at VfB Stuttgart, playing mainly in its reserve team, before joining Eintracht Braunschweig in 2012. Two years later, he moved to 1899 Hoffenheim.

Bičakčić represented Germany and Bosnia and Herzegovina at youth levels, but decided to represent the latter at senior level. He made his senior international debut in 2013, earning over 30 caps since. Bičakčić represented the nation at their first major championship, the 2014 FIFA World Cup.

Club career

Early career
Because of the outbreak of Bosnian War, Bičakčić's family fled from his native Bosnia and Herzegovina and moved to Germany, where he started playing football at local clubs, before joining VfB Stuttgart's youth academy in 2005. He made his professional debut against Chemnitzer FC on 27 October 2010 at the age of 20. On 29 July 2011, he scored his first professional goal in a triumph over Wehen Wiesbaden.

In January 2012, he switched to Eintracht Braunschweig.

1899 Hoffenheim

In May 2014, Bičakčić was transferred to 1899 Hoffenheim for an undisclosed fee. He made his official debut for the side in DFB-Pokal game against USC Paloma on 17 August and managed to score a goal. A week later, he made his league debut against FC Augsburg. On 4 February 2015, he scored his first league goal in a loss to Werder Bremen.

In September 2016, he extended his contract until June 2020.

Bičakčić helped 1899 Hoffenheim make their first historical UEFA Champions League appearance in 2018–19 season. On 23 October 2018, he debuted in the competition against Lyon.

He played his 100th game for the team on 19 December.

Bičakčić signed a new three-year deal with the club in May 2019.

In September 2020, he suffered a severe knee injury, which was diagnosed as anterior cruciate ligament tear and was ruled out for at least six months. He returned to the pitch on 14 May 2022, over 19 months after the injury.

In June, he put pen to paper on a new one-year contract.

International career

Despite representing Germany at under-18 level, Bičakčić decided to play for Bosnia and Herzegovina at senior level. He was first part of Bosnia and Herzegovina under-19 team.

In August 2013, his request to change sports citizenship from German to Bosnian was approved by FIFA. Later that month, he received his first senior call-up, for a friendly game against the United States, and debuted in that game on 14 August.

On 10 September, in a 2014 FIFA World Cup qualifier against Slovakia, Bičakčić scored his first senior international goal.

In June 2014, Bičakčić was named in Bosnia and Herzegovina's squad for 2014 FIFA World Cup, country's first major competition. He made his tournament debut in the opening group match against Argentina on 15 June.

Career statistics

Club

International

Scores and results list Bosnia and Herzegovina's goal tally first, score column indicates score after each Bičakčić goal.

References

External links

1990 births
Living people
People from Zvornik
Bosniaks of Bosnia and Herzegovina
Bosnia and Herzegovina Muslims
Bosnia and Herzegovina refugees
Bosnia and Herzegovina emigrants to Germany
Naturalized citizens of Germany
German footballers
Germany youth international footballers
Bosnia and Herzegovina footballers
Bosnia and Herzegovina youth international footballers
Bosnia and Herzegovina international footballers
Bosnia and Herzegovina expatriate footballers
Association football central defenders
VfB Stuttgart II players
VfB Stuttgart players
Eintracht Braunschweig players
TSG 1899 Hoffenheim players
3. Liga players
Bundesliga players
2. Bundesliga players
Expatriate footballers in Germany
Bosnia and Herzegovina expatriate sportspeople in Germany
2014 FIFA World Cup players